Kornel Filipowicz (27 October 1913 – 28 February 1990) was a Polish novelist, poet and screenwriter, most notable for his short stories.

Works (selection)

Poetry
 Mijani (The Ones Passed By, 1943)
 Powiedz to słowo (Say This Word, 1997)

Prose
 Krajobraz niewzruszony (Landscape Unmoved, 1947)
 Księżyc nad Nidą (The Moon Over Nida, 1950)
 Ulica Gołębia (Gołębia Street, 1955)
 Ciemność i światło (Darkness and Light, 1959)
 Biały ptak (A White Bird, 1960)
 Romans prowincjonalny (A Provincial Romance, 1960)
 Pamiętnik antybohatera (The Memoir of an Anti-Hero, 1961; English translation by Anna Zaranko, 2019, winner of the Found in Translation Award 2020)
 Mój przyjaciel i ryby (My Friend and Fishes, 1963)
 Jeniec i dziewczyna (A Captive and A Girl, 1964)
 Ogród pana Nietschke (The Garden of Mr. Nietschke, 1965)
 Mężczyzna jak dziecko (A Man As a Child, 1967)
 Co jest w człowieku (What's In the Man, 1971)
 Śmierć mojego antagonisty (The Death of My Antagonist, 1972)
 Gdy przychodzi silniejszy (When the Stronger, 1974)
 Kot w mokrej trawie (A Cat In a Wet Grass, 1977)
 Dzień wielkiej ryby (The Day of a Great Fish, 1978)
 Zabić jelenia (To Kill a Deer, 1978)
 Krajobraz, który przeżył śmierć (The Landscape That Survived the Death, 1986)
 Rozmowy na schodach (Conversations At the Stairs, 1989)
 Wszystko, co mieć można (All That One Can Have, 1991)

Screenplays
 Trzy kobiety (Three Woman, 1956)
 Miejsce na ziemi (A Place on Earth, 1959)
 Głos z tamtego świata (The Voice From the Other World, 1962)
 Piekło i Niebo (Heaven and Hell, 1966)
 Szklana kula (Crystal Ball, 1972)

Awards
 Gold Cross of Merit (1955)
 Officer's Cross of Polonia Restituta (1963)

References

1913 births
1990 deaths
Burials at Salwator Cemetery
Polish male poets
20th-century Polish male writers
20th-century Polish poets
Polish military personnel of World War II
Gross-Rosen concentration camp survivors
Sachsenhausen concentration camp survivors
Officers of the Order of Polonia Restituta
Recipients of the Gold Cross of Merit (Poland)
Writers from Ternopil
20th-century Polish screenwriters
Male screenwriters